Arno Nordlund (born 2 September 1935) is a Finnish footballer. He played in two matches for the Finland national football team in 1961.

References

1935 births
Living people
Finnish footballers
Finland international footballers
Place of birth missing (living people)
Association footballers not categorized by position